St Mary's College on Shear Brow (B6233), Blackburn, Lancashire, England was established by the Marist Fathers in 1925. It was a modern college for students aged between 16 and 18.  Most students took what is known in the UK as Advanced-Levels (A-Levels) or, if in the first year; Advanced, Subsidiary Levels (AS-Levels).

The college closed on 1 August 2022.

History

Grammar school
The college was founded as a Catholic Boys Grammar School by the Marist Fathers in 1925 and the former football ground of Blackburn Olympic F.C. was subsequently acquired by the Fathers as a site on which to build the school. It became St Mary's College RC Grammar School.

Sixth form college
The Finley-Stokes Centre was opened in March 2005.  The opening ceremony was performed by the Right Rev. Bishop Thomas Burns, a former teacher at the school.  The building was named in honour of former principal Michael Finley, who retired in 2008, and former deputy principal Peter Stokes, who died in 2004.

A new science block was completed in August 2007, which was named 'The Graystone Science Centre'.  The building was named after a former headmaster of the grammar school, Father Graystone. Following this the new performing arts complex was completed and was officially opened in February 2008, the centre has been named the 'O'Neill Academy of Performing Arts' in honour of former college principal, Rev. Kevin O'Neill.  The new Arts Centre has theatrical devices, including retractable seating in a multi-purpose room used for rehearsal and performances, as well as lighting and sound technology.  The building also includes several rehearsal and workshop spaces, a dance studio, as well as hosting a music room outfitted with computer software, and a recording studio.

On 12 May Alastair Campbell opened St. Mary’s new, dedicated Enterprise Centre. This £500,000 building was funded by the No Limits Local Enterprise Growth Initiative (LEGI) and supported by Blackburn with Darwen Borough Council and Regenerate Pennine Lancashire.  During the afternoon Campbell held a question and answer session with history and politics students of the College followed by a book signing session before the actual opening at 3:45 pm.

In 2017, allegations of sexual abuse perpetrated by the late Kevin O'Neill led the governing body to remove from the performing arts centre all mentions of O'Neill's name. The body declared they were intending to change the name of the centre. A case study was submitted during 2020 to IICSA, a statutory inquiry for England and Wales "The Marist Fathers
Their culture and concealment of child sexual abuse, and the ‘watchdogs’ that refuse to watch, bark or bite.".

The College closed on 31st July 2022.

Courses 
 16-19 A-level courses
 Degree courses
 Adult / evening courses
 Enhancement courses

Alumni
 Eniola Aluko, footballer
 Anthony Green, actor
 John Hopkins, landscape architect (Olympic Park, 2012) 
 Fred Smithies, trade union leader

St Mary's College RC Grammar School
 Sir Gerald Barling QC profile, nationalarchives.gov.uk; accessed 21 February 2016.
 Thomas Burns (bishop)
 Mike Duxbury, footballer - Manchester United and England
 Brian Miller (footballer) - Burnley and England. Manager - Burnley FC
 Greg Pope, Labour MP for Hyndburn
 Sir John Skehel, virologist

References

External links
 [ The official St Mary's College website]

Video clips
 The official St Mary's College YouTube page

MarysCollege
MarysCollege
Catholic secondary schools in the Diocese of Salford
Sixth form colleges in Lancashire
Educational institutions established in 1925
Catholic universities and colleges in England
1925 establishments in England